Vladimir Sergeyevich Sergeyev (28 June 1883 N.S. - 8 January 1941 in Moscow) was a Soviet historian of classical antiquity.

During 1934-41 Sergeev served as the head of Department of Ancient History at the Moscow State University and the Moscow Institute of Philosophy, Literature and History. During 1936-41 worked in the Institute of History Soviet Academy of Sciences. Sergeev concentrated on the history of Ancient Greece and Ancient Rome and was author of the first Soviet textbooks about this topic.

Selected works
 Очерки по истории Древнего Рима (Essays on the History of Ancient Rome), (2 parts), 1938.
 История Древней Греции (History of Ancient Greece), 1939.

1883 births
1941 deaths
Soviet historians
Professors of the Moscow State University
Russian scholars of Roman history